Barbara June Schaaf (born February 22, 1965 in Oak Lawn, Illinois) is an American former handball player who competed in the 1992 Summer Olympics.

References

1965 births
Living people
People from Oak Lawn, Illinois
Sportspeople from Cook County, Illinois
American female handball players
Olympic handball players of the United States
Handball players at the 1992 Summer Olympics
21st-century American women